Alpine skiing at the 1968 Winter Olympics consisted of six events, held 9–17 February at Chamrousse, southeast of Grenoble, France.
Jean-Claude Killy of France won all three men's events, repeating Toni Sailer's triple-gold of 1956. Since Killy's feat, no male alpine ski racer has won three gold medals in a single Olympics. (Janica Kostelic later won three gold medals in the 2002 Winter Olympics).

This was the first Olympics with a two-run men's giant slalom, with one run per day. The women's giant slalom was one run until 1980.

For the only time, the results from Olympic races were included in the World Cup standings, then in its second season.  Following the 1970 season, Olympic and World Championship results were not included in the World Cup points standings.

Medal summary
Four nations won medals in alpine skiing and the host country led the medal table with eight. France won four gold, three silver and a bronze, as Jean-Claude Killy swept the three men's events. The top women's medalist was Canada's Nancy Greene, with one gold and one silver.

Medal table

Source:

Men's events

Source:

Women's events

Source:

Course information

Source:

Participating nations
Thirty-three nations sent alpine skiers to compete in the events in Innsbruck. West and East Germany competed separately for the first time and Morocco made its Olympic alpine skiing debut. Below is a list of the competing nations; in parentheses are the number of national competitors.

World championships
From 1948 through 1980, the alpine skiing events at the Winter Olympics also served as the World Championships, held every two years.  With the addition of the giant slalom, the combined event was dropped for 1950 and 1952, but returned as a World Championship event in 1954 as a "paper race" which used the results from the three events. During the Olympics from 1956 through 1980, World Championship medals were awarded by the FIS for the combined event. The combined returned as a separate event at the World Championships in 1982 and at the Olympics in 1988.

Combined

Men's Combined

Downhill: 9 February, Giant Slalom: 11–12 February, Slalom: 17 February

Women's Combined

Downhill: 10 February, Giant Slalom: 15 February, Slalom: 13 February

References

External links
FIS-Ski.com – alpine skiing – 1968 Winter Olympics – Grenoble, France

 
1968 Winter Olympics events
Alpine skiing at the Winter Olympics
Winter Olympics
Alpine skiing competitions in France